Huron—Bruce (formerly known as Huron and Huron—Middlesex) is a provincial riding in Ontario, Canada, that has been represented in the Legislative Assembly of Ontario since 1987. It was known as Huron from 1987 to 1999.

On March 22, 1940, the Liberal member, Charles Robertson, died while in office. Premier Mitchell Hepburn (and later, Daniel Conant) refused to call a by-election for three years citing wartime considerations. He said the electorate was "sick and tired of elections." CCF leader Ted Jolliffe opposed Hepburn's choice and took the government to court over the delayed by-election. The Ontario Court of Appeal sided with the government on the issue. Jolliffe said that he would appeal the decision to the Supreme Court but no further action was taken before the 1943 election was called.

Members of Provincial Parliament

Huron—Middlesex
Huron—Middlesex was known as Huron before 1975.
James Simpson Ballantyne, Liberal (1934–1943)
Robert Hobbs Taylor, Progressive Conservative (1943–1947)
Thomas Pryde, Progressive Conservative (1948–1958)
Charles MacNaughton, Progressive Conservative (1958–1973)
Jack Riddell, Liberal (1973–1987)

Election results

2007 electoral reform referendum

References

Notes

Citations

External links
Elections Ontario Past Election Results
Map of riding for 2018 election

Ontario provincial electoral districts
Goderich, Ontario